Alison Helene Becker (born March 8, 1977) is an American actress. She is best known for appearing in NBC's Parks and Recreation.

Early life and education
Becker grew up in Allamuchy Township, New Jersey. She attended Georgetown University in Washington, D.C., where she graduated cum laude with a degree in English in 1999. After college graduation, she moved to New York City and began exploring the fields of theatre and comedy, creating a variety of original characters and sketch comedies.

Career
Becker is a regular player at the Upright Citizens Brigade improv theatre. She has also performed for Hopscotch: A New York Sex Comedy, Caroline's on Broadway, and other comedy clubs. She starred on Boiling Points, the MTV prank television show. She was a VJ on the music video TV channel Fuse, where she hosted F-List and some other shows. She was the host of VH1's Top 20 Video Countdown. She is on the online show Mayne Street with ESPN broadcaster Kenny Mayne on ESPN. She was a co-host on the FuelTV talk show The Daily Habit and had a recurring role on NBC's Parks and Recreation, appearing in all seven seasons as local newspaper reporter Shauna Malwae-Tweep. She appeared once on HBO's Curb Your Enthusiasm in the ninth season as a yoga instructor. She also appeared in the CollegeHumor "Badman" Batman spoof videos and a "If Google Was a Guy" sketch. She also appeared in commercials for Dairy Queen (featuring chicken and waffles), for the Chrysler Pacifica hybrid, and for Realtor.com.

Filmography

Television

Online appearances

Film
 Class Action Park (2020)
 Control (2017)
 Spare Change (2015)
 The Other Guys (2010)
 May the Best Man Win (2008)
 Arranged (2007)
 God-Links (2006)
 Premium (2006)
 Four Dead Batteries (2004)
 Pushing Tom (2003)

References

External links 

Alison Becker's Blog
Interview at WickedInfo.com

1977 births
Living people
Actresses from New Jersey
American film actresses
American television actresses
American television personalities
American women television personalities
American television writers
American voice actresses
Georgetown College (Georgetown University) alumni
People from Allamuchy Township, New Jersey
American women comedians
American women television writers
Comedians from New Jersey
Screenwriters from New Jersey
21st-century American actresses
21st-century American comedians
21st-century American screenwriters